The Pacific bearded brotula (Brotula clarkae) also known as the pink bearded cusk-eel or the red bearded cusk-eel is a species of cusk eel found in the Pacific ocean. It's described as being reddish-brown with dark fins.

Description 

Three short barbels on either side of the snout and three barbels on either side of the lower jaw, pelvic fins under the middle of the head that are made up of two filaments linked basally, and dorsal and anal fins that merge into a pointed tail fin. It has a flat body that diminishes in thickness near the back end. It's eyes, mouth and gill openings are large. Small, slick scales cover the body. It contains around 108–118 dorsal soft rays, 27–28 pectoral rays and 78–89 analsoft rays. They also have 55–56 vertebrae.

Range and distribution 

It ranges across Mexico all the way to the Gulf of California, and the Eastern Central Pacific. It ranges over countries which includes Guatemala, Honduras, Mexico, El Salvador, Nicaragua, United States, Ecuador, Peru, Colombia and Costa Rica.

Behaviour 

They are oviparous and characterized by larvae in midwater that are late post-flexion and transition stage. Elusive animals, they are rarely observed by humans and they rest in caves by day and hunt by night. They consume polychaete worms, tiny clams, crabs, and other invertebrates for food.

References 

Ophidiidae